A partial lunar eclipse took place on Sunday, August 15, 1943. The Moon was strikingly shadowed in this deep partial eclipse which lasted 2 hours and 58 minutes, with 87% of the Moon in darkness at maximum.

Visibility

Related lunar eclipses

Saros series
It is part of Saros series 137.

See also 
List of lunar eclipses and List of 21st-century lunar eclipses

External links 
 Saros series 137
 

1943-08
1943 in science